Yellamma Temple, also known as Renuka Temple (Kannada: ರೇಣುಕಾ ಯಲ್ಲಮ್ಮ ದೇವಿ ದೇವಸ್ಥಾನ), is a temple of Goddess (Devi) Renuka and a pilgrimage destination located about  away from the town of Saundatti in the Indian state of Karnataka. It is situated on a hilltop known earlier as Siddhachal Parvat and now known as "Yellamma Gudda", named after the temple. The deity in the temple is the goddess Yellamma or Ellama or Renuka, revered as a fertility goddess. The temple is associated with the ancient Devadasi practice of dedicating girls to the temple, which the Government of Karnataka claims to have eliminated. The hill, a part of the Sidhachal or Ramagiri hill range which overlooks the Malaprabha river, contains archaeological evidences of occupation dating to the mid-8th to mid-11th centuries of the early Rashtrakuta or late Chalukyan period, and includes megalithic tombs which predate these periods.

Location
The hill on which the Yellamma Temple sits is part of the Sidhachal or Ramagiri range, oriented east–west and overlooking the Malaprabha river near the town of Savadatti.

History
The temple was built in 1514 by Bomappa Nayaka of Raybag (Bommappa Nayaka of Raibog). According to archaeological evidence found around the temple, a temple existed here either during the early Rashtrakuta or late Chalukyan period from the mid-8th to the mid-11th centuries. The megalithic tombs found here are dated to a much earlier period. Also seen on the hill are potsherds of early historic redware dated to the 3rd century BCE to the 3rd century CE, in addition to megalithic blackware and redware. It is believed that the Yellamma fertility cult was prevalent here even during the Chalukyan period, following their taking possession of this region from the Kadambas of Banavasi.

Another place of worship is the sacred "Yogarbavi Satyabamma Kunda" or tank at the lower end of the hill, where devotees bathe and put on new clothes before proceeding to the temple for worship. A notable custom observed here is called "Nimmana", which involves the circumambulation of the "Sathyamma Temple" with neem leaves in their mouths. The temple deity is also known as Jagadamba, meaning "Mother of the Universe" and is believed to be a form of Kali.

The temple has been under the management of the Government of Karnataka since 1975. Facilities for pilgrims visiting the temples, like Dharmashalas (free guest houses), health centers, and other basic facilities, have been created by the government.

Features
 
The Yellamma Temple is built in the Chalukyan and Rashtrakuta style. According to the government gazetteer, the goddess worshiped in the temple is associated with Parasurama's (an incarnation of Vishnu) mother Renuka, the wife of the sage Jamadagni. She is revered as one of the Saptamatrika or seven divine mothers, who protected the earth and its rulers. The goddess is also known as Yelumakkaltai, meaning "the mother of seven children" in Kannada language. She is a cult figure worshiped by the pastoral community of the Dhangar and Kurumbas of southern Maharashtra and North Karnataka.

There are three water tanks or ponds at the back side of the temple known as Kumkum Kundam, Yoni Kundam, and Arihan Kundam. These are considered holy and are places where people bathe and offer worship. There is also a sacred well called the Jogal bhavi; the water of this well is believed to cure skin diseases. Another location adjacent to the temple known as Parasurama Kshetra is believed to be the site where Lord Parausrama sat in penance.

Within the temple precincts stand shrines dedicated to Lord Ganesh, Mallikarjun, Parashuram, Eknath, and Siddeshwar.

Festivals
Festivals are held at the venue of the temple twice a year during October to April. A very large number of pilgrims from Karnataka Andhra Pradesh, Goa, and Maharashtra visit the temple during these festivals.

See also
 Marikamba Temple, Sirsi

References

Bibliography

External links

Hindu temples in Shimoga district
Devi temples in Karnataka
Renuka